Phlattothrata is a genus of dwarf spiders that was first described by C. R. Crosby & S. C. Bishop in 1933.

Species
 it contains two species:
Phlattothrata flagellata (Emerton, 1911) (type) – USA
Phlattothrata parva (Kulczyński, 1926) – Russia (Siberia to Far East), North America

See also
 List of Linyphiidae species (I–P)

References

Araneomorphae genera
Holarctic spiders
Linyphiidae
Spiders of the United States